Cozart is a surname. According to Dictionary of American Family Names, "it probably a variant spelling of Dutch Cossaert, a nickname for a confidante, sweetheart, or flatterer, from an agent derivative of Middle Dutch cosen ‘to whisper’. Perhaps a variant of French Cossard, which is either a nickname for a lazy person or a derivative of cosse ‘pod’ (see Cosse)." It may refer to:

 Bernadette Cozart (1949–2009), American gardener, botanist, and urban gardening advocate
 Bruce Cozart (born 1955), American politician
 Charlie Cozart (1919–2004), American baseball player
 Craig Cozart (born 1974), American college baseball coach
 Cylk Cozart (born 1957), American actor
 Keith Cozart (born 1995), aka Chief Keef, American Rapper
 Zack Cozart (born 1985), American baseball player

References